
Gmina Łużna is a rural gmina (administrative district) in Gorlice County, Lesser Poland Voivodeship, in southern Poland. Łużna is located approximately  north-west of Gorlice and  south-east of the regional capital Kraków.

Villages
Gmina Łużna consists of the following villages: Biesna, Bieśnik, Łużna, Mszanka, Szalowa and Wola Łużańska.

Neighbouring gminas
Gmina Łużna is surrounded by Bobowa, Gorlice, Grybów and Moszczenica.

References
Polish official population figures 2006

Luzna
Gorlice County